"What a Night" is a song by American singer Kat DeLuna featuring Jeremih. It was released on February 26, 2016, and appeared on DeLuna's compilation album Loading  (2016). The song was written by Jeremih, George M. Ladkani, Samuel Jean, Tyrone Edmond, and the duo Da Beat Freakz.

The song contains a sample of "December, 1963 (Oh, What a Night)" by American pop rock band The Four Seasons.

Music video
The music video for "What a Night" premiered on March 1, 2016, on DeLuna's Vevo channel. It was directed by Haitian-born model Tyrone Edmond.

Charts

References

External links

2016 songs
2016 singles
Kat DeLuna songs
Jeremih songs
Songs written by Jeremih